Old Town Bridge Tower is a gothic monument located in Prague, Czech Republic. Its construction began in 1357 AD, during the rule of the Emperor Charles IV. It was designed by the architect Petr Parléř.

See also

 Malá Strana Bridge Tower

References

External links

Old Town (Prague)
Towers in Prague